Douglas, New Zealand may refer to:

 Douglas, Canterbury
 Douglas, Taranaki